Goniobranchus coi is a species of very colourful sea slug, a dorid nudibranch, a marine gastropod mollusc in the family Chromodorididae.

Distribution
This species was described from Vietnam. It occurs in the tropical Western Pacific Ocean from Australia to the Philippines and rarely as far East as the Marshall Islands.

Description
Goniobranchus coi has a white body and foot, but is instantly recognizable by its distinct dorsal pattern. The outer part of the mantle is yellow, separated from the inner light-brown part by a wavy white and black line. The outer edge of the mantle is brown, with a thin purple line at the margin. The gills and rhinophores range in colour between different individuals from translucent white, through pale-yellow and light-brown. This species reaches at least 50 mm in length.

Ecology
Like most sea slugs in the superfamily Doridoidea, Goniobranchus coi feeds on sponges. It has been seen feeding on the sponge Chelonaplysilla violacea.

References

External links
 

Chromodorididae
Gastropods described in 1956